Jackson, MS Metropolitan Statistical Area is a metropolitan statistical area (MSA) in the central region of the U.S. state of Mississippi that covers seven counties: Copiah, Hinds, Holmes, Madison, Rankin, Simpson, and Yazoo. As of the 2010 census, the Jackson MSA had a population of 586,320. According to 2019 estimates, the population has slightly increased to 594,806. Jackson is the principal city of the MSA.

Counties
Copiah
Hinds
Holmes
Madison
Rankin
Simpson
Yazoo

Communities

Places with more than 25,000 inhabitants
Jackson (Principal City)
Jackson is the capital of and the most populous city in the State of Mississippi. It is one of the county seats of Hinds County (Raymond being the other). As of the 2020 census, Jackson's population was 153,701.
Clinton
Madison
Pearl
Brandon

Places with 10,000 to 25,000 inhabitants
Byram
Canton
Flowood
Ridgeland
Yazoo City

Places with 1,000 to 10,000 inhabitants
Crystal Springs
Durant
Edwards
Flora
Florence
Gluckstadt
Goodman
Hazlehurst
Lexington 
Magee
Mendenhall
Pelahatchie
Pickens
Raymond
Richland
Tchula
Wesson

Places with fewer than 1,000 inhabitants
Beauregard
Bentonia
Bolton
Braxton
Cruger
D'Lo
Eden
Georgetown
Learned
Puckett
Satartia
Terry
Utica
West

Unincorporated places

Demographics

As of the census of 2000, there were 497,197 people, 180,556 households, and 127,704 families residing within the MSA. The racial makeup of the MSA was 53.02% White, 45.29% African American, 0.13% Native American, 0.67% Asian, 0.02% Pacific Islander, 0.29% from other races, and 0.60% from two or more races. Hispanic or Latino of any race were 0.98% of the population.

Geography and climate
The Jackson metropolitan area possesses a humid subtropical climate, with very hot, humid summers and mild winters.  Rain is very evenly spread throughout the year, and snow can fall in wintertime, although heavy snowfall is relatively rare. Much of the areas rainfall occurs during thunderstorms. Thunder is heard on roughly 70 days per annum. The Jackson metropolitan area lies in a region prone to severe thunderstorms which can produce large hail, damaging winds and tornadoes.

The most damaging tornado in Mississippi history occurred on March 3, 1966, when an EF-5 tornado spawned in southwest Hinds County and proceeded to move northeasterly for several hours until finally lifting in southwest Tuscaloosa County, Alabama. The storm, called the Candlestick Park tornado for a destroyed Jackson shopping center, killed 58 and injured 216.

Industry
The metro area is home to several major industries. These include electrical equipment and machinery, processed food, and primary and fabricated metal products. The surrounding area supports agricultural development of livestock, soybeans, cotton, and poultry.

Education

Colleges and universities
Belhaven University (Jackson)
Copiah-Lincoln Community College (Wesson)
Delta Technical College (Ridgeland) www.deltatechnicalcollege.com
Hinds Community College (Raymond with branch campuses in Jackson, Pearl, and Utica)
Holmes Community College (Goodman with branch campus in Ridgeland)
Jackson State University (Jackson)
Millsaps College (Jackson)
Mississippi College (Clinton)
Mississippi College School of Law (Jackson)
Reformed Theological Seminary (Jackson)
Tougaloo College (Jackson)
University of Mississippi Medical Center (Jackson)
University Center (Jackson) - serves as branch campuses for the University of Mississippi, Mississippi State University, and University of Southern Mississippi.
Wesley Biblical Seminary (Jackson)
Wesley College (Florence)

Public school districts
Canton Public School District (serves the city of Canton)
Clinton Public School District (serves the city of Clinton)
Copiah County School District (serves Copiah County)
Hazlehurst City School District (serves the city of Hazlehurst)
Hinds County School District (serves Hinds County outside of the Jackson city limits)
Holmes County School District (serves Holmes County)
Jackson Public School District (serves the city of Jackson)
Madison County School District (serves Madison County outside Canton)
Pearl Public School District (serves the city of Pearl)
Rankin County School District (serves Rankin County)
Simpson County School District (serves Simpson County)
Yazoo County School District (serves Yazoo County)

Private schools
 Benton Academy (Benton)
 Canton Academy (Canton)
 Central Hinds Academy (Raymond)
 Central Holmes Christian School (Lexington)
 Christ Covenant School (Ridgeland)
 Clinton Christian Academy (Clinton)
 Copiah Academy (Gallman)
 Discovery Christian School (Florence)
 East Rankin Academy (Pelahatchie)
 Emmanuel Christian School (Jackson)
 First Presbyterian Day School (Jackson)
 Hartfield Academy (Flowood)
 Hillcrest Christian School (Jackson)
 Jackson Academy (Jackson)
 Jackson Preparatory School (Flowood)
 Madison-Ridgeland Academy (Madison)
 Manchester Academy (Yazoo City)
 Mount Salus Christian School (Clinton)
 New Jerusalem Christian School (Jackson)
 Park Place Christian Academy (Pearl)
 Piney Woods Country Life School (rural Rankin County) https://www.pineywoods.org/
 REBUL Academy (Learned)
 Simpson Academy (Mendenhall)
 St. Augustine Christian School (Ridgeland)
 St. Andrew's Episcopal School (middle and upper schools Ridgeland; lower school Jackson)
 St. Joseph Catholic School
 Tri-County Academy (Flora)

Media

Newspapers

Daily
 The Clarion-Ledger statewide general interest newspaper, at http://www.clarionledger.com

Weekly
 Copiah Monitor, weekly newspaper serving Copiah County (home office Hazelhurst), at http://www.copiahmonitor.com
 Hinds County Gazette, weekly newspaper serving Hinds County (home office Raymond), at http://www.hindscountygazette.com
 Jackson Advocate,  weekly newspaper and oldest newspaper serving the state's African-American community, at http://www.jacksonadvocate.com
 Jackson Free Press, alternative newspaper, with focus on politics, entertainment and culture; blogs and discussion at http://www.jacksonfreepress.com
 La Noticia de Mississippi – Voz de la Comunidad Latina – The Mississippi Hispanic Newspaper at http://www.lanoticianewspaper.com/
 The Mississippi Link weekly statewide general interest newspaper (home office Jackson), focusing on the African American community, at http://www.themississippilink.com
 Mississippi Business Journal weekly newspaper (home office Jackson), with focus on business and economic development, at http://www.msbusiness.com
 The Northside Sun weekly newspaper, with focus on Northeast Jackson, Madison and Ridgeland, at http://www.northsidesun.com
 B Fit and Healthy Magazine, Health and Fitness Magazine for Mississippians, at http://bfitandhealthymagazine.com
 Holmes County Herald, weekly newspaper serving Holmes County (home office Lexington, at http://www.holmescountyherald.com
 Madison County Herald, weekly newspaper serving Madison County (home office Canton), at http://www.mcherald.com
 Madison County Journal, weekly newspaper serving mostly Madison County suburbs of Jackson (home office Ridgeland), at http://www.onlinemadison.net
 Rankin County News, weekly newspaper serving Rankin County (home office Brandon), at http://www.rankincn.com
 Magee Herald/Simpson County News, weekly newspaper serving Simpson County (offices in Magee and Mendenhall), at //www.simpsoncounty.ms
 Yazoo Herald, weekly newspaper serving Yazoo County (home office Yazoo City), at http://www.yazooherald.net

Historic
 The Jackson Mississippian, circulated during the 19th century
 Jackson Daily News, evening newspaper in Jackson (published 1907 to 1934; merged with The Clarion-Ledger in 1934 but editorially operated separately; discontinued publishing in 1982)
 Jackson State-Times, daily newspaper in Jackson (published 1952 to 1963)

Publishing
 University Press of Mississippi, the state's only not-for-profit publishing house and collective publisher for Mississippi's eight state universities, producing works on local history, culture and society

Television
All stations are licensed to Jackson unless otherwise noted:
 Channel 3, WLBT: NBC
 Channel 6, WJMF-LD
 Channel 12, WJTV: CBS
 Channel 16, WAPT: ABC
 Channel 23, WWJX: TCT
 Channel 29, WMPN: PBS/Mississippi Public Broadcasting
 Channel 34, WRBJ-TV: TBN, licensed to Magee
 Channel 35, WLOO: My Network TV, licensed to Jackson suburb Tougaloo
 Channel 40, WDBD: Fox

FM radio

AM radio
 620 WJDX: News/Talk
 780 WIIN: Blues
 810 WSJC: Religious
 930 WSFZ: News/Talk with programming from Black Information Network
 970 WFQY: Hip Hop
 1000 WXTN: Religious
 1120 WTWZ: Folk
 1150 WONG: Hip Hop 
 1180 WJNT: News/Talk
 1240 WZQK: Country
 1300 WOAD: Gospel Music
 1370 WMGO: Variety
 1400 WJQS: Sports

Points of interest

Sports

Sports teams in the Jackson Metro area

Mississippi Braves—minor league baseball affiliate (AA) of the Atlanta Braves.  The team plays at Trustmark Park in Pearl, Mississippi.
Mississippi Brilla—minor league soccer team in the Premier Development League.  The team plays at Clinton High School in Clinton, Mississippi.
Mississippi Raiders—Arena Indoor Football League team which plays its home games at the Mississippi Coliseum.

Summer Training Camp
New Orleans Saints, Jackson's Millsaps College is the former summer home for the New Orleans Saints of the NFL from 2006 to 2010

Sports venues in the Jackson Metro area
Mississippi Veterans Memorial Stadium—Concerts, Football (home of Jackson State University)
Mississippi Coliseum—Basketball, Hockey, Track, Rodeo, Concerts
Smith Wills Stadium—Baseball, Softball, Football, Soccer, Concerts
Trustmark Park—Baseball
Parham Bridges—Tennis

Professional events
Sanderson Farms Championship-PGA Tour event held in May at Country Club of Jackson

Former professional sports teams
Baseball
Jackson Senators, Independent (2001–2004) 
Jackson Diamond Kats of the independent Texas–Louisiana League (2000)
Jackson Generals, former Texas League AA affiliate of the Houston Astros (1991–1999)
Jackson Mets, former Texas League AA affiliate of the New York Mets (1975–1990)
Basketball
Jackson Wildcats, United States Basketball League
Mississippi Rage, World Basketball Association
Mississippi Hardhats, World Basketball Association
Hockey
Jackson Bandits -- East Coast Hockey League
Soccer
Jackson Calypso—Women's Soccer
Jackson Rockers—Men's Soccer
Jackson Chargers—Men's Soccer
Football
Mississippi Pride -- Regional Football League
Las Vegas Posse -- Canadian Football League—As a historical note, the team almost moved to Jackson, but efforts to relocate the team to Mississippi failed.

Transportation

Air travel
The Jackson area is currently served by Jackson-Evers International Airport, located at Allen C. Thompson Field in Rankin County between Flowood and Pearl. Its IATA code is JAN. The airport has non-stop service to 12 cities throughout the United States and is served by four mainline carriers (American, Delta, United, and Southwest). JAN also serves as host for the State of Mississippi's and private citizens' jet aircraft.

On 22 December 2004, Jackson City Council members voted 6–0 to rename Jackson International Airport in honor of slain civil rights leader and NAACP field secretary for Mississippi, Medgar Evers. This decision took effect on 22 January 2005.

The Jackson area was formerly served by Hawkins Field, located in northwest Jackson with IATA code HKS. This airport is now used for private air traffic only.

A proposed new access from Downtown Jackson to Jackson-Evers International Airport is the Airport Parkway project. This parkway will connect High Street in Downtown Jackson to Mississippi Highway 475 at the airport. The parkway will be of interstate standards and designated Interstate 755 with access to both Flowood and Pearl. Although approved in 2008 with studies completed and right-of-way obtained, no construction has been done as of 2022.

Ground transportation

Interstate highways
 Interstate 55Runs north-south from Chicago through Jackson towards Brookhaven, McComb, and the Louisiana state line to New Orleans. Jackson is roughly halfway between New Orleans and Memphis, Tennessee. The highway maintains eight to ten lanes in northern part of city, six lanes in the center and south of I-20.

 Interstate 20Runs east-west from near El Paso, Texas, to Florence, South Carolina. Jackson is roughly halfway between Dallas, and Atlanta. The highway is six lanes from Interstate 220 to MS 468 in Pearl.

 Interstate 220Connects Interstates 55 and 20 on the north and west sides of the city and is four lanes throughout its route.

U.S. highways
 U.S. Highway 49 Runs north-south from the Arkansas state line at Lula via Clarksdale and Yazoo City, to I-220 on the northwest side of Jackson. The highway then follows I-220 to I-20, where it heads east to just pass the I-55/I-20 split in Pearl. From Pearl US 49 goes south towards Hattiesburg and Gulfport.

 U.S. Highway 51The predecessor route from Chicago to New Orleans, US 51 runs along with I-55 from County Line Road on the Jackson/Ridgeland border to Terry. US 51 runs separately to the north in Ridgeland and to the south from Terry. The former route of Hwy 51 is designated as State Street through Jackson and connects with I-55/I-20 south of the interstate split in South Jackson

 U.S. Highway 80 Roughly parallels Interstate 20.

State highways
 Mississippi Highway 18Runs southwest towards Raymond, Utica, and Port Gibson; southeast towards Bay Springs and Quitman.

 Mississippi Highway 25Some parts of this road are known as Lakeland Drive, which runs northeast towards Carthage and Starkville.

Other roads
In addition, the area is served by the Natchez Trace Parkway, which runs from north of the city through Ridgeland and Clinton, Mississippi. Overall the federally-regulated parkway runs from Natchez to Nashville, Tennessee.

Bus service
JATRAN (Jackson Transit System) operates hourly or half-hourly during daytime hours on weekdays, and mostly hourly on Saturdays. No evening or Sunday service is operated.

Railroads

Jackson is served by the Canadian National Railway (formerly the Illinois Central Railroad). The Kansas City Southern Railway also serves the city. The Canadian National has a medium-sized yard downtown which Mill Street parallels and the Kansas City Southern has a large classification yard in Richland. Amtrak, the national passenger rail system, provides service to Jackson.  The Amtrak station is located at 300 West Capitol Street.  Amtrak's southbound City of New Orleans provides service from Jackson to  New Orleans and some points between.  The northbound City of New Orleans provides service from Jackson to Memphis, Carbondale, Champaign-Urbana, Chicago and some points between. Efforts to establish service with another Amtrak train, the Crescent Star, an extension of the Crescent westward from Meridian, Mississippi, to Dallas, Texas, failed in 2003.

See also
Mississippi census statistical areas
List of metropolitan areas in Mississippi
List of micropolitan areas in Mississippi
List of cities in Mississippi
List of towns and villages in Mississippi
List of census-designated places in Mississippi
List of United States metropolitan areas

References

 
Geography of Hinds County, Mississippi
Geography of Copiah County, Mississippi
Geography of Madison County, Mississippi
Geography of Rankin County, Mississippi
Geography of Simpson County, Mississippi